Granulina cerea is a species of very small sea snail, a marine gastropod mollusk or micromollusk in the family Granulinidae.

Description

Distribution

References

External links
 Smriglio C, Gubbioli F. & Mariottini P. 2000. New data concerning the presence of Granulina Jousseaume, 1888 (Neogastropoda, Cystiscidae) along the West African coast and description of four new species. La Conchiglia, 32 (297): 54-59

Granulinidae
Gastropods described in 2000